The Thaton Kingdom, Suwarnabhumi, or Thuwunnabumi (  or  ) was a Mon kingdom, believed to have existed in Lower Burma from at least the 4th century BC to the middle of the 11th century AD.   One of many Mon kingdoms that existed in modern-day Lower Burma and Thailand, the kingdom was essentially a city-state centered on the city of Thaton.  It traded directly with South India and Sri Lanka, and became a primary center of Theravada Buddhism in South-East Asia. Thaton, like other Mon kingdoms, faced the gradual encroachment of the Khmer Empire.  But it was the Pagan Kingdom from the north that conquered the fabled kingdom in 1057.

Name of the kingdom
Mon tradition maintains that the kingdom was called Suvannabhumi, a name also claimed by Lower Thailand, and that it was founded during the time of the Buddha in the 6th century BCE.  Thaton is the Burmese name of Sadhuim in Mon, which in turn is from Sudhammapura in Pali, after Sudharma, the assembly hall of the gods.

History
According to the Mon tradition, the Kingdom of Thaton was founded during the time of the Buddha, and was ruled by a dynasty of 59 kings. The tradition also maintains that a group of political refugees founded the city of Pegu (Bago) in 573. But the historical kingdom probably came into existence some time in the 9th century, following the entry Mon people into Lower Burma from modern northern Thailand. GE Harvey's History of Burma, citing the Shwemawdaw Thamaing, gives the year of founding of Pegu as 825; even that date remains unattested. Indeed, the earliest mention of Pegu is 1266, in Old Burmese.

Traditional Burmese and Mon reconstructions hold that Thaton was overrun by the Pagan Kingdom from Upper Burma in 1057. King Anawrahta, having been converted to Theravada Buddhism by a Mon monk, Shin Arahan, reportedly asked for the Theravada Buddhist canon from King Manuha of Thaton. The Mon king's refusal was used by Anawrahta as a pretense to invade and conquer the Mon kingdom, whose literary and religious traditions helped to mold early Pagan civilization. According to the chronicles, King Manuha of Thaton surrendered after a 3-month siege of the city by Pagan's forces on 17 May 1057 (11th waxing of Nayon, 419 ME). Between 1050 and about 1085, Mon craftsmen and artisans reportedly helped to build some two thousand monuments at Pagan, the remains of which today rival the splendors of Angkor Wat. The Mon script is the source of the Burmese alphabet, the earliest evidence of which is dated to 1058, a year after the Thaton conquest.

There are several archaeological sites attributed to the Tahton Kingdom. Suvarnabhumi City in Bilin Township is one such site with limited excavation work. The site, called Winka Old City by other archeologists, contains 40 high-grounds of which only 4 have been excavated. The Winka site, along with nearby walled sites like Kyaikkatha and Kelasa, have been dated as early as the sixth century. While the archaeology of early Lower Burmese sites requires more work, other urban centres in Myanmar like the Sri Ksetra Kingdom in modern day Pyay were Buddhist as early as the 5th century.

However, some modern research has argued that Mon influence on the interior after Anawrahta's conquest is a greatly exaggerated post-Pagan legend, and that Lower Burma in fact lacked a substantial independent polity prior to Pagan's expansion. Possibly in this period, the delta sedimentation—which now extends the coastline by three miles a century—remained insufficient, and the sea still reached too far inland, to support a population even as large as the modest population of the late precolonial era. Whatever the condition of the coast, all scholars accept that during the 11th century, Pagan established its authority in Lower Burma and this conquest facilitated growing cultural exchange, if not with local Mons, then with India and with Theravada stronghold Sri Lanka. From a geopolitical standpoint, Anawrahta's conquest of Thaton checked the Khmer advance in the Tenasserim coast.

List of Thaton kings

According to the Mon chronicles, the Kingdom of Thaton had a line of 59 kings that begun from the time of the Buddha.

See also
 Mon kingdoms
 Hanthawaddy Kingdom
 Restored Hanthawaddy Kingdom

Notes

References
 
 
 
 
 
 
 
 
 

Former countries in Burmese history
Former kingdoms
Former monarchies of Asia
Burmese monarchy
1st millennium in Southeast Asia
States and territories established in the 4th century BC
States and territories disestablished in the 1050s
4th-century BC establishments
1057 disestablishments